The Lokys is a stream in Jonava District Municipality, Lithuania. It is a tributary of Neris. The name literally means "bear" in Lithuanian.

In 2005, an adventure park "Lokės pėda" ("Bear's Foot") was established in the Lokys valley, by the Lokėnėliai village.

References

Jonava District Municipality
Rivers of Lithuania